Lithocarpus ewyckii is a tree in the beech family Fagaceae. It is named for D.J. van Ewijck van Oostbroek en De Bilt of the Dutch Colonial Service.

Description
The smooth or scaly bark is greyish brown to reddish brown.

Distribution and habitat
Lithocarpus ewyckii grows naturally in Peninsular Malaysia, Singapore, Sumatra and Borneo.

References

ewyckii
Trees of Malaya
Trees of Sumatra
Trees of Borneo
Plants described in 1844